Walmir Amaral (born Rio de Janeiro, December, 1939) is a Brazilian comic artist. He worked at the publishing house Rio Gráfica Editora (RGE) from 1957 to 1986, where he produced covers and illustrations for several licensed characters, especially for Lee Falk's The Phantom (some of the stories he produced for the character were also published in Sweden). In the 1960s, Amaral began writing and drawing the comics for O Anjo, a radio character previously drawn by Flavio Colin. Amaral drew some western comics like Straight Arrow and Black Rider.

Amaral was also one of the creators of the project Gibi Semanal, in which he worked as editor and writer. The comic book featured weekly publication of comic strips and stories of characters such as Beetle Bailey, Popeye, Peanuts, Frank and Ernest, Tarzan, Rip Kirby (known in Brazil as Nick Holmes), The Cisco Kid, The Spirit, Dick Tracy, Lucky Luke, among many others.

At Editora Abril, he illustrated Zorro stories based on the Disney TV series, The Herculoids from Hanna-Barbera in the comic book Heróis da TV and the series Alex and Cris, published in Revista Crás.

In 1990, he was awarded with the Prêmio Angelo Agostini for Master of National Comics, an award that aims to honor artists who have dedicated themselves to Brazilian comics for at least 25 years.

References

External links 
 

Brazilian comics artists
Prêmio Angelo Agostini winners
Disney comics artists